Edward Riddell Robson (21 August 1890 – 1977) was an English professional footballer who played as a goalkeeper for Sunderland.

References

1890 births
1977 deaths
People from Allendale, Northumberland
Footballers from Northumberland
English footballers
Association football goalkeepers
Gateshead F.C. players
Watford F.C. players
Portsmouth F.C. players
Sunderland A.F.C. players
Swansea City A.F.C. players
Wrexham A.F.C. players
Grimsby Town F.C. players
Rochdale A.F.C. players
English Football League players